Coningsby is in Lincolnshire, England.

Coningsby may also refer to:

Coningsby (novel)

Fitzwilliam Coningsby (c.1600-1666) Royalist
Humphrey Coningsby (judge) (1459-1535) English judge
Humphrey Coningsby (died 1559) MP for Herefordshire
Humphrey Coningsby (died 1601) MP for St Albans
Humphrey Coningsby (born ca 1623) MP and Royalist
Thomas Coningsby (disambiguation)
William Coningsby (1483-1540) MP and bencher

See also
George Capel-Coningsby, 5th Earl of Essex (1757- 1839)